Homer "Saki" Topacio Saquilayan (born July 13, 1955) is a Filipino politician who served as the mayor of the city of Imus, Cavite. He has an extraordinary record in his political career, as he was elected mayor three times and was also unseated the same number of times because of the electoral protests filed by his rivals.

Political career
Saquilayan was elected as vice mayor in 1998 and served until 2001, when he decided to challenge incumbent Mayor Oscar Jaro in his reelection bid. He defeated Jaro by only 748 votes. Jaro proceeded to contest the election results in all of the precincts and in January 2004, the Imus Regional Trial Court declared him the winner by 5,257 votes.

In the elections that year, he and Jaro challenged each other again and defeated the latter by about 1,000 votes. Jaro filed an electoral protest again and was declared by the Imus Regional Trial Court the winner by 584 votes in 2007. He and Jaro would run against each other for the third time that year but Jaro withdrew from the race and endorsed Vice Mayor Emmanuel Maliksi instead. He was defeated by Maliksi in that race.

In 2010, he was elected again as mayor, winning over Maliksi by a margin of 8,499 votes. Maliksi filed an electoral protest and was declared by the Imus Regional Trial Court the winner by 665 votes in 2011. However, on March 12, 2013, he was declared by the Supreme Court as the true winner and he took his oath six days later, on March 18. However, on April 11, 2013, it reversed its ruling and remanded the case back to the COMELEC.

In 2016 elections, Saquilayan decided to run as 3rd District Provincial Board Member under the United Nationalist Alliance. His brother, City Councilor Edgardo Saquilayan run under ONE IMUS, a coalition between Imus City's Liberal Party and UNA, with his rival, Mayor Maliksi and other LP candidates.

In 2019, he ran as Mayor against incumbent Mayor Maliksi, but lost.

In 2022 elections, he run for a vice mayoral post with his long-term political partner incumbent Rep. Alex 'AA' Advincula of the lone district of Imus City as his running mate.

References

Living people
People from Imus
Nacionalista Party politicians
1955 births
Filipino engineers
Mayors of places in Cavite
Laban ng Demokratikong Pilipino politicians
Members of the Cavite Provincial Board